Balbura dorsisigna is a moth of the subfamily Arctiinae first described by Francis Walker in 1854. It is found in Panama, Honduras, Venezuela and Ecuador.

References

Lithosiini